Érik Karol (born 15 March 1963) is a French singer author & composer.

He received the Charles Cros Academy Award and another as the Best Single of the Year at the Festival International d'Expression Française in Bordeaux for his single Partir en 1988.

Karol joined the French-Canadian Company Cirque du Soleil in 1999 and was the original singer and main character for their show, Dralion.

Recordings
 Partir/Viens avec moi 7" & 12"(1987)
 Victoria/Lira 7" & 12"(1989)
 Le Cabaret des Eléments "Chant d'Ether" (1998)
 Cirque du Soleil "Dralion'' (1999) BMG Music Canada
 Salto Natale "Chamäleon" (2002)
 Erik Karol "Polyphonic Trees" (2010)
 Erik Karol "Harda Vidya" (2011)

Books
 Anneaux Marines (Editions Caractères- 1994)

Movies soundtracks
 Hemingway, a portrait (Eric Canuel-Montréal-1999)
 Nuit Blanche (Daniel Colas-Paris-2007)

References

External links
 http://erik-karol.com

1963 births
Place of birth missing (living people)
French singer-songwriters
Living people